Gonzalo Ignacio Di Renzo (born 30 December 1995) is an Argentine professional footballer who plays as a right winger for UD Lanzarote.

Career
Di Renzo began in the youth system of Liniers, before joining Lanús in 2011. He was promoted into their first-team for the 2015 Argentine Primera División season, making his debut on 15 February during a win away to Quilmes. He made twenty-one appearances in all competitions in his debut season, as well as scoring twice including his career first in the Copa Sudamericana in September versus Belgrano. However, Di Renzo didn't make an appearance in the 2016 or 2016–17 campaigns. On 11 August 2016, Di Renzo was loaned to Sarmiento. Nineteen appearances followed with relegation to Primera B Nacional.

In July 2017, Di Renzo joined fellow Primera División side Patronato on loan. He made his debut versus San Martín (SJ) on 27 August, which was the first of eight matches for Patronato before he returned to Lanús in December 2017. January 2019 saw Di Renzo switch Argentina for Venezuela by signing a loan contract with Deportivo Lara. He scored his first regular season career goal on 24 February versus Deportivo Anzoátegui. On 23 January 2020, Di Renzo headed to the United States on loan with USL Championship team San Antonio FC. He made his debut on 7 March against Real Monarchs.

Di Renzo's first goal for San Antonio came in a South Texas Derby win over Rio Grande Valley FC Toros on 25 July 2020; his 60th-minute goal was assisted by fellow Argentine Cristian Parano. He scored again against RGVFC on 28 August, which was preceded by a goal versus Oklahoma City Energy a week prior. In March 2021, Di Renzo joined Estudiantes of Primera Nacional on a free transfer. He debuted in a 1–1 home draw with San Martín (T) on 20 March.

In January 2022, Di Renzo joined Spanish Tercera División RFEF club UD Lanzarote.

Career statistics
.

References

External links

1995 births
Living people
Sportspeople from Bahía Blanca
Argentine footballers
Association football forwards
Argentine expatriate footballers
Argentine Primera División players
Venezuelan Primera División players
USL Championship players
Club Atlético Lanús footballers
Club Atlético Sarmiento footballers
Club Atlético Patronato footballers
Asociación Civil Deportivo Lara players
San Antonio FC players
Estudiantes de Buenos Aires footballers
UD Lanzarote players
Expatriate footballers in Venezuela
Expatriate soccer players in the United States
Expatriate footballers in Spain
Argentine expatriate sportspeople in Venezuela
Argentine expatriate sportspeople in the United States
Argentine expatriate sportspeople in Spain